WebsEdge, based in London, United Kingdom, is a media and production company who specialize in online broadcasting. WebsEdge produce films and run various online TV channels (including Local Government Channel, Global Health TV, ICMA TV, and Education Now!).

History 

Founded in 1998 as HBL Media, the company originally operated as a broadcast consultancy, video production and media training company. After early growth in the late nineties the company expanded into PR and magazine publishing, as well as developing the London Stock Exchange Media Centre.

In 2004, after attending annual meetings such as the TUC Annual Conference and various Local Government Association (LGA) conferences; HBL Media developed the concept of Conference TV. This was producing television programmes about the conferences they attended, and in 2005 expanded into the Local Government Channel.

Following this, Global Health tv was launched in 2006 and Education Now! in 2008.

In May 2008 representatives of WebsEdge attended the 25th Anniversary of the historic International AIDS Candlelight Memorial in Malawi. They have worked closely alongside the Isibindi Project in South Africa’s Eastern Cape since; supporting the partnership between the local church and the National Association of Child Care Workers to create circles of care for children affected by HIV/AIDS and poverty.

After undergoing a rebranding exercise in 2007 and assuming the WebsEdge name the core focuses for 2009 remain in Conference TV, the ongoing development of the online channels, media services and global expansion, concentrated on China and America.

Flagship Channels 

WebsEdge create and run television channels for the public and private sector, covering areas such as health, education, and government. Their channels screen on the internet, at major conferences, and on television through both IPTV and Satellites.

Local Government Channel
The Local Government Channel is the leading broadcaster for all local government news and issues, covering a range of interviews, discussions and features with key players in Local Government. The Local Government Channel also hosts the annual Council Worker of the Year Awards championing the unsung heroes of local government. 
Global Health TV
Global Health TV is produced for the Global Health Council to address complex global health problems with a projected audience of health-care professionals, health foundations, businesses, government agencies, academic institutes and aid workers.

Conference TV
WebsEdge produces television programmes for many leading international conferences and exhibitions. Capturing news, interviews and speech highlights from the event and then broadcasting these on plasma screens around the venue and even delegate’s hotel bedrooms. 
US Office
As a result of the success of US operations in 2007 and early 2008, WebsEdge opened a new office in Washington D.C. in the autumn of 2008.

References

Companies based in the London Borough of Southwark
Film production companies of the United Kingdom